This is a list of viceroys in British Honduras and Belize from the start of British settlement in the area until the colony's independence in 1981. Until 1862, the territory was under the vice-regency of the Governor of Jamaica, and administered by a Superintendent. After this it was a colony in its own right, and administered by a Lieutenant Governor, still subordinate to Jamaica. In 1884, the colony gained its own governor, independent of Jamaica.

In 1973 the colony's name was changed to Belize and in 1981 it gained independence. For a list of viceroys after independence, see Governor-General of Belize.

Superintendents of British Honduras (1749–1862)
 Robert Hodgson, Sr., 1749–1758
 Richard Jones, 1758–1760
 Joseph Otway, 1760–1767
 Robert Hodgson, Jr., 1767–1775
 John Ferguson, 1776
 James Lawrie, 1776–10 March 1787
 Edward Marcus Despard, 1787 – June 1790
 Lt Gen Peter Hunter (acting), June 1790 – March 1791
 Thomas Potts (chief magistrate), March 1791 – January 1797
 Thomas Barrow, January 1797 – 1800, first time
 Richard Basset, 1800–1802
 Thomas Barrow, January 1803 – 1805, second time
 Gabriel Gordon, 1805–1806
 Alexander Mark Kerr Hamilton, 1806–1809
 John Nugent Smyth, 1809–1814
 Sir George Arthur, 1814–1822
 Allan Hampden Pye, 1822–1823
 Edward Codd, 1823–1829
 Alexander MacDonald, 1829–1830, first time
 Sir Francis Cockburn, 1830–1837
 Alexander MacDonald, 1837–1843, second time
 Charles St. John Fancourt, 1843–1851
 Sir Philip Edmond Wodehouse, 1851–1854
 Sir William Stevenson, 1854–1857
 Frederick Seymour, 1857–1862

Lieutenant Governors of British Honduras (1862–1884)
In 1862, the territory became a crown colony, and was subsequently administered by a Lieutenant Governor, subordinate to the Governor of Jamaica.

 Frederick Seymour, 1862–1864, continued
 John Gardiner Austin, 1864–1867
 Sir James Robert Longden, 1867–1870
 Sir William Wellington Cairns, 1870–1874
 Sir Robert Miller Mundy, 1874–1877
 Sir Frederick Palgrave Barlee, 1877–1883
 Col Sir Robert William Harley, 13 May 1883 – 1884

Governors of British Honduras (1884–1973)
In 1884, the colony was severed from its dependency to Jamaica and gained its own Governor.
 Sir Roger Tuckfield Goldsworthy, 1884–1891
 Sir Cornelius Alfred Moloney, 1891–1897
 Sir David Wilson, 1897–1904
 Sir Ernest Bickham Sweet-Escott, 15 April 1904 – 1906
 Sir Eric John Eagles Swayne, 13 August 1906 – 9 May 1913
 Sir Wilfred Collet 19 May 1913 – January 1918
 William Hart-Bennett, 29 January 1918 – 4 September 1918
 Sir Eyre Hutson, 22 March 1919 – 1925
 Sir John Alder Burdon, 16 April 1925 – 1932
 Sir Harold Baxter Kittermaster, 9 March 1932 – 1934
 Sir Alan Cuthbert Maxwell Burns, 2 November 1934 – 1939
 Sir John Adams Hunter, 24 February 1940 – 1 July 1946
 Sir Arthur Norman Wolffsohn, 1 July 1946 – 14 January 1947, acting
 Sir Edward Gerald Hawkesworth, 14 January 1947 – 1948
 Sir Ronald Herbert Garvey, 28 February 1949 – 1952
 Sir Patrick Muir Renison, 21 October 1952 – 1955
 Sir Colin Hardwick Thornley, 17 January 1956 – 1961
 Sir Peter Hyla Gawne Stallard, 9 December 1961 – 1966
 Sir John Warburton Paul, 11 July 1966 – January 1972
 Sir Richard Neil Posnett, 26 January 1972 – 31 May 1973

Governors of Belize (1973–1981)
On 1 June 1973, the colony of British Honduras was renamed Belize.
 Sir Richard Neil Posnett, 1 June 1973 – 1976, continued
 Peter Donovan McEntee, 1 June 1976 – 1980
 Sir James Hennessy, 1980 – 21 September 1981

On 21 September 1981 Belize gained independence from the United Kingdom. For viceroys of Belize after independence, see Governor-General of Belize.

References

 http://www.rulers.org/rulb1.html#belize

British Honduras
Governors and administrators of British Honduras